The Fenwick Weavers' Society was a professional association created in the village of Fenwick, East Ayrshire, Scotland in 1761.  
In 1769, the society formed a consumer co-operative for the benefit of members.  
The original purpose of the society was to foster high standards in the weaving craft, but activities later expanded to include collective purchasing of bulk food items and books.  
The latter resulted in the creation of the Fenwick Library in 1808.

This practice of collective purchasing for the benefit of members has led many to consider Fenwick Weavers' Society the first co-operative.

The Society was reconvened in March 2008 and has been reconstituted as a co-operative, in legal form as an industrial and provident society, in order to record, collect and commemorate the heritage of the Fenwick Weavers.

References
Crawford, John. "The community library in Scottish history." 68th IFLA Council and General Conference, August 18–24, 2002.
East Ayrshire Council tourism website
Carrell, Severin. "Strike Rochdale from the record books. The Co-op began in Scotland", The Guardian, August 7, 2007
McFadzean, John. "The Co-operators - A History of the Fenwick Weavers". East Ayrshire North Communities Federation Ltd, 2008.

East Ayrshire
History of East Ayrshire
Co-operatives in Scotland
1761 establishments in Scotland
Organizations established in 1761
Consumers' cooperatives in the United States